A Mother's Love or Mother Love is a 1939 drama film directed by Gustav Ucicky and starring Käthe Dorsch, Paul Hörbiger and Wolf Albach-Retty.

It was made by the Vienna-based Wien-Film which had been established following the German annexation of Austria the previous year. The film's sets were designed by the art directors Kurt Herlth and Werner Schlichting.

The film portrays the various sacrifices of a mother for her children. It was one of the comparatively few films made in Nazi Germany that celebrated the role of mothers in society, despite the Nazi Party's official promotion of a cult of motherhood.

Cast

References

External links

1939 drama films
Films of Nazi Germany
Austrian drama films
German drama films
Films directed by Gustav Ucicky
UFA GmbH films
German black-and-white films
1930s German films
1930s German-language films